Abdullah Qureshhi (1935 – 9 December 2007) was an activist in the Labour Party of Pakistan who was killed in a suicide bomb attack in the Swat Valley.

Life 
He founded "Swat Rorwali" in the 1950s. He was exiled to Gojaranwala, Punjab in the 1960s.

References

Pashtun people
1935 births
2007 deaths
People from Swat District